Brooke Harman-Walker is an American-born Australian actress.

Biography 
Born in Orange County, California and moving to Brisbane, Queensland as a young child, her first television role was at age eleven on the children's television series The Wayne Manifesto. She has since guest starred on a number of television programs including Home and Away, All Saints, White Collar Blue, Beastmaster, Flipper, The Sleepover Club, and appeared in the 2003 film Ned Kelly. Harman played the feature role of Silvy Lewis in the Paramount motion picture Till Human Voices Wake Us with Guy Pearce and Helena Bonham Carter.  Brooke also starred in the children's television program Pirate Islands, and became a permanent castmember of The Secret Life of Us in the year before the show's cancellation. She played the role of Kate Monk on the short-lived Australian drama headLand.

Her surname is sometimes credited as Harmon (or more rarely, Harmen).

Personal life 
Brooke has been married since 2006 to Australian actor and director Jeffrey Walker. Together they have three children, sons, Boston Scott Walker (b. June 24, 2013), Ace Jackson Walker (b. June 24, 2015) and Leo Walker (b. October 20, 2018). The family resides in Brisbane, Australia.

Filmography

References

External links

 

1985 births
Living people
20th-century Australian actresses
21st-century Australian actresses
Australian child actresses
American emigrants to Australia
Australian film actresses
Australian television actresses
Actresses from Brisbane